Lee Jin-woo (born September 3, 1982) is a South Korean football player.

Club career

Lee started his professional career with K League club Ulsan Hyundai FC before switching to Daejeon Citizen for the 2009 season. Having limited opportunities with Daejeon, for 2010, Lee dropped down to the second tier of Korean football, the Korea National League, in order to ply his trade with Ulsan Hyundai Mipo Dockyard FC.

References

External links

Lee Jin-woo at n-league.net

1982 births
Living people
South Korean footballers
K League 1 players
Ulsan Hyundai FC players
Daejeon Hana Citizen FC players
Korea National League players
Korea University alumni
Association football forwards